Being Mrs Elliot is a 2014 Nigerian romantic comedy film, co-produced and directed by Omoni Oboli. It stars Majid Michel, Omoni Oboli, Ayo Makun, Sylvia Oluchy and Seun Akindele. It premiered at Nollywood Film Festival in Paris on 5 June 2014. It received 6 nominations at the 2014 Best of Nollywood Awards and was also nominated in 9 categories at the 2014 Golden Icons Academy Movie Awards taking place in October.

Cast
 Omoni Oboli as Lara
 Majid Michel as Bill 
 Sylvia Oluchy as Nonye
 Ayo Makun as Ishawuru 
 Seun Akindele as Fisayo
 Uru Eke as 
 Lepacious Bose as Bimpe
 Chika Chukwu as

Production
The film was shot in Lagos, Ekiti and Asaba. In an interview with Encomium Magazine, Oboli stated that she expects to make 200 million Naira from the film.

Reception
The movie is seen as a repeat of another of the producers movies, with the same male lead role in fact. It is Opined by Pulse movie Review that Brother's keeper and Being mrs elliot have too much in common and is regarded as a counterproductive move.

Release
The film was screened at the Nigerian Presidential Complex with many dignitaries in attendance including president Goodluck Jonathan and vice-president Namadi Sambo. It had its world premiere on 30 August 2014 at Silverbird Galleria, Victoria Island, Lagos and was released theatrically across Nigeria on 5 September.

See also
 List of Nigerian films of 2014

References

External links

English-language Nigerian films
2014 romantic comedy-drama films
Nigerian romantic comedy-drama films
Films shot in Lagos
2014 comedy films
2014 drama films
2010s English-language films